Sang Won Kang is a South Korean professor of proteomics at the Ewha Womans University whose numerous peer-reviewed articles have appeared in such journals as Journal of Biological Chemistry and the Journal of the American Society of Nephrology with the highest one being cited over 1,000 times.

References

Living people
20th-century births
Proteomics
South Korean biologists
Academic staff of Ewha Womans University
Year of birth missing (living people)